The Boys' Brigade (BB) is an international interdenominational Christian youth organisation, conceived by the Scottish businessman Sir William Alexander Smith to combine drill and fun activities with Christian values. Following its inception in Glasgow in 1883 the BB quickly spread across the United Kingdom, becoming a worldwide organisation by the early 1890s. As of 2018, the Boys' Brigade claimed 750,000 members in 60 countries.

Object, motto and emblem

The stated object of the Boys' Brigade is "the advancement of Christ's kingdom among Boys and the promotion of habits of Obedience, Reverence, Discipline, Self-respect and all that tends towards a true Christian manliness." Except for the addition of the word "obedience" in 1893, the contents of the object has remained unchanged from the beginning. However, some countries, particularly those which permit girls on their membership roll, have re-worded the object for gender neutrality. For example, in Malaysia, the word "manliness" has been changed to "character".

From this verse came the BB motto, "Sure and Stedfast", retaining the old spelling of the latter word. Today, some parts of the movement (only the UK and the Republic of Ireland) have adopted the modern spelling of "steadfast", whilst all others continue to use the older spelling.

The crest was originally a plain anchor, bearing the BB motto with a capital 'B' on either side. Upon the merger between the Boys' Brigade and the Boys' Life Brigade in 1926, the red Greek cross was placed behind the anchor to form the current emblem. The cross originally formed part of emblem of the Boys' Life Brigade.

History
The Boys' Brigade was founded in Glasgow by Sir William Alexander Smith on 4 October 1883 to develop Christian manliness by the use of a semi-military discipline and order, gymnastics, summer camps and religious services and classes. 
 
By 1910, there were about 2200 companies connected with different churches throughout the British Empire and the United States, with 10,000 officers and 100,000 boys.

Boys' Brigade Scouts, 1906–1927
Companies of The Boys' Brigade used manuals on scout training in their programmes. In May 1903, Robert Baden-Powell became a vice-president. Baden-Powell promoted the idea of scouting and outdoor pursuits in the Boys' Brigade and other boys' organisations and schools. The Boys' Brigade formally began its boy scout scheme in 1906. Scout badges (Silver second class & Gold first class) were awarded in The Boys' Brigade and there were specialised Boys' Brigade Scout sections, which operated as part of a BB Company, but met at different times to train in scouting, who wore khaki or blue uniforms, neck scarves and the distinctive four dented broad brimmed fur felt hats. Boys of the Bournemouth & Poole Battalion of The Boys' Brigade participated in Baden-Powell's experimental camp on Brownsea Island in 1907. Baden-Powell did not originally intend to start a separate organisation.

Many Boys' Brigade Scouts later made dual registration with The Boy Scouts Association. The 1st Bournemouth Scouts was run by the 1st Bournemouth Boys' Brigade as a 'BP' Scout group and never a 'BB Scout 'Section'. The Boys' Life Brigade, which merged with The Boys' Brigade in 1926, also operated its own boy scouts and was a member organization of the National Peace Scouts with the British Boy Scouts. The Boys' Brigade Scouts continued until 1927. Some former Boys' Brigade Scout units continued independently after 1927 or affiliated with The Boy Scouts' Association or British Boy Scouts. Two of the original Boys' Brigade Scout units continue as 1st Parkstone Scout Group and 1st Hamworthy Scout Group, both formerly sub units of the 1st Poole Boys Brigade.

Merger with Boys' Life Brigade, 1926
In October 1926 The Boys' Brigade united with The Boys' Life Brigade. The merger also prompted the abandonment of dummy drill rifles that had been used in The Boys' Brigade, due to the Life Brigade's objection to use of weapons or their representations. The Junior organisation of the Boys' Brigade prior to 1926 was called 'The Boy Reserves' but after amalgamation the juniors were called 'The Life Boys'. The name came from the fact that the junior reserve of The Boys' Life Brigade had been known as 'Lifeboys' (all one word). The Life Boys remained as the 'Junior Reserve of The Boys' Brigade until 1966 when the name was changed to 'The Junior Section'.

The Boys' Life Brigade (1899) was one of many similar movements formed following the formation of The Boys' Brigade. The BLB was formed by the National Sunday School Union (Pacifist) and was strongest amongst non-conformist churches. It substituted first aid drill for the military and weapons drill used in The Boys' Brigade. Others organisations similar to The Boys' Brigade included the Church Lads' Brigade (1891, Anglican) and London Diocesan Lads' Brigade (Anglican), the Catholic Boys' Brigade (1894) and the Jewish Lads' Brigade (1895). There were many more smaller Brigades in other denominations and even some in individual churches.

Establishment of recreational camping
Drawing from his military experience, William Smith (Knighted in 1909) introduced the concept of camping into the Brigade to allow boys and officers to remain in contact when other activities ceased for the summer break.
 
The notion was initially ill-received due to concerns for the boys' safety.  A mother has been quoted saying, "Camp! My children have always had a roof over their heads, and as long as I live, always will!". They did have a roof over their heads because William Smith proceeded with the idea and 1st Glasgow Company held its inaugural one-week camp beginning on Friday, 16 July 1886, at Auchinlochan Hall, Tighnabruaich in a hall. In later years they took to canvas camping on a site at Portavadie in the Kyles of Bute. The First Glasgow continued to attend summer camp at the same location until the summer of 1974 when Portavadie was selected as the location of a proposed yard for the construction of oil production platforms. However the new camp is located only 100 yards away at Stilliag farm. This camp site is now used by many companies of the BB every summer for their camping trip.

The initial reservations towards camping did not last. A tradition developed, where the boys who were marching home on the last day of camp would be greeted by cheers from residents and were each presented with a bouquet of flowers. Camps soon became one of the most anticipated events in the year and early publications of the Boys' Brigade Gazette contained many accounts of camping experiences.

Sir William Smith's plans and notes for his first camps have been preserved, and have been used by many other campers.

Sections in the BB

Age groups are typically based on school years, so boys in the same year group would be promoted to the next section together, regardless of the dates of individual boys' birthdays. In some companies, sections may merge or there may be minor variations to the normal age boundaries, to accommodate excessively large or small groups of boys or a lack of leaders. Boys might also move to their next section before the end of the year to allow a smoother transition.

Australia has three different age groups, known as "sections":
Anchors – 5 to 7 years
Juniors – 8 to 11 years
Seniors – 12 to 18 years
 'Alpha' – 12 to 14
 'Omega' – 15 to 18
Malaysia has four sections:
Pre-Juniors – 6 to 8 years
Juniors – 9 to 12 years
Seniors– 12 to 18 years
Primer– 18 to 21 years

(All Malaysian Boys' Brigade companies may accept girls into membership with the approval of their respective sponsoring authorities.)

United Kingdom has four  sections:
 Anchor 5 to 8 years (companies need special permission to accept boys younger than 5 years old)
 Juniors  – 8 to 11 years
 Company  – 11 to 15 years
 Seniors  – 15 to 18 years
Officers company and over

(Companies may choose to run a Girls' Association alongside or in combination with these sections)

In the United Kingdom and Eire The BB is divided into four Regions, each region is then further divided. In Scotland and England & Wales The BB is divided into Districts and then Battalions. In Northern Ireland the BB is divided into 13 Battalions. The Battalions provide a local grouping of companies. The Battalions are normally based on Cities or Counties. Each Battalion has its own local structure that organises events and training on behalf of the member companies.each with its own Battalion President and Executive Team who assist the President in running the Battalion.

Amicus Groups
United Kingdom
Amicus was launched in 1994, and is intended to either run as an alternative to the Seniors programme or even without any other Boys' or Girls' Brigade sections operating. Unlike other sections which may be for boys only in many companies, Amicus is always run as a mixed-gender group. The Amicus concept emphasises involvement of all its members in decision-making concerning the running of the section, such as the content and whether a uniform is to be worn. The section is overseen and supervised by leaders aged over 18, who have received training from the Boys' Brigade and may deliver parts of the programme.

Leadership

Officers (adult leaders)
Leaders in training are Warrant Officers, attaining the rank of Lieutenant only when having completed additional formal training in youth leadership.  To avoid unnecessary leader hierarchy, all qualified officers are Lieutenants.  The post of Captain of a company is a brevet rank with those in the position reverting to Lieutenant when they cease to be in the position; similarly, other positions such as the company Adjutant (second to the captain) are considered appointments rather than substantive ranks.

Boys bearing the rank of Staff-Sergeant are non-commissioned officers but act within the company as Officers.

Boys as non-commissioned officers

An older boy can gain promotion from Private to become a Non-Commissioned Officer (NCO). There are four NCO ranks available, each being awarded when a boy is of a certain minimum age and reaches a high enough standard of leadership:

 Lance Corporal — L/Cpl (minimum age 14)
 Corporal — Cpl (minimum age 15)
 Sergeant — Sgt (minimum age 16)
 Staff Sergeant — S/Sgt (minimum age 17)

NCOs often play an important role in the Boys' Brigade, helping the officers and other adult helpers with organising activities and awards classes, particular in the Anchors and Juniors sections.  NCOs wear chevrons on their upper right arm.

Staff Sergeants act within the company as officers and do not stand in the ranks; however as Staff Sergeants are boys of the Brigade, they can still partake in company activities and competitions, and still earn awards and badges. The uniform of Staff Sergeants is slightly different from that of the normal boy or NCO, they will still wear a blue shirt.  If caps are worn, the BB Anchor is used with no coloured surround.  Their rank is denoted with an armband on the right forearm with four inverted chevrons (similar to the rank badge historically worn by senior grades of sergeant in the British Army).

 United Kingdom
 In the United Kingdom, those aged 17 to 21 years old who are nominated by their company, may participate in The Boys' Brigade KGVI Youth Leadership Training; this consists of two one-week-long residential training experiences containing all the training needed to become an officer in The Boys' Brigade. KGVI is held at each of the Regional Headquarters (Felden Lodge in England/Wales, Carronvale House in Scotland and Newport Centre in Northern Ireland).

Awards
Each section within the Boys' Brigade has awards that can be gained by fulfilling achievements.

Anchor Section
The Anchors can gain three badges: Green, Red and Blue triangles by completing a variety of activities in the areas of Body, Mind, Spirit, Community, and Creativity.

The Anchors award structure was revamped in 2020 and now have the following badges available, Anchors Membership Award, Core Awards of Yellow Award, Green Award, Blue Award and the Red Award.

Junior Section
The Juniors award scheme was revised in 2004 and members of the section can now gain the Junior Target Award, followed by Bronze, Silver and Gold awards, by completing a variety of activities in the areas of Body, Mind, Spirit, Community, and Creativity.

The Juniors award structure was revamped again in 2020 and now have the following badges available, Juniors Membership Award, Core awards of Bronze, Silver and Gold, and Project Awards of Get Active, Get Adventurous, Get Creative, Get Into The Bible, Get Involved and Get Learning.  The Leading Boy/Girl Badges have also been replaced by Team Leader.  This structure also sees the introduction of a "Nights Away" badge and can be awarded at 1, 3, 5, 10, 20, 30, 40, 50, 75 & 100 nights.  This continues from the Junior Section through to the Company and Senior Sections.

Company Section

Get the Credit [Outdated]
Under the old 'Get the Credit' Scheme, Company Section members could gain one Target badge first (reduced from the required two in an award reorganisation a few years ago, though Target Two could still be completed as an optional extra), then five other badges (Interests, Adventure, Leadership, Physical and Community) with red and blue flashes around them. After about three years, the boys would have gained all five badges with both red and blue flashes. This enabled the boys to attend a Leadership Training Course and potentially attain the President's Badge. This is a necessary prerequisite for the Brigade's highest award – the King's Badge.

Discover
The current award scheme for 11- to 15-year-olds, called Discover, was launched in August 2007. The award scheme is built around three 'zones': Community; Recreation; and Skills. Badges may be gained at four Levels in each zone, 1 through 4.

Having spent two hours working on topics relevant to each of the three zones (a total of six hours), the member is awarded the Compass Badge.

The badge for a zone is gained when the required number of hours have been spent working on topics relevant to that zone (Community – seven hours; Recreation – 10 hours; Skills – 7 hours). A maximum of one badge per zone can be gained in a 12-month period (min 24 hours work). Any additional hours may not be carried over into the next 12-month period. In subsequent 12-month periods, members will work to gain Levels 2, 3, and 4 of each badge.

During a member's second year in Company Section they may gain the Discovery Badge, provided they have: gained a badge in all three zones within the last 12 months; completed an additional 6 hours work in any of the zones; taken part in a residential experience; played an active role in a Company, Battalion, or Church event; and had good attendance for the session.

The Discover programme includes the President's Badge, the requirements for which remain similar to those laid out in the 'Get the Credit' scheme. Including a 'Building Your Skills' Course

See images and logos at boys-brigade.org.uk.

Challenge Plus
The award scheme for Seniors (16- to 18-year-olds), is called Challenge Plus, and was launched in time for the start for the 2008/09 Session, and includes the King's Badge.

King's Badge
King's Badge is the highest award in the senior section in the UK and the Commonwealth; it is equivalent to a Founder's Badge.

Founder's Badge
In non-Commonwealth countries, the Founder's Badge is used in place of the King's Badge. However, the Boys' Brigade in Malaysia and the Boys' Brigade in Singapore have chosen to use the Founder's Badge, although these countries are members of the Commonwealth.

President's Badge
President's badge is the second highest award in the senior section, it is also a requirement for members before undertaking the highest award which is Founder's badge. The title of Founder's Man and President's Man are held for life, recognizing all rounds of excellence in their service. The Badge itself may be worn while serving as a Non-Commissioned Officer (NCO), a Staff-Sergeant, or a Primer.

International

Sovereign countries

Dates in parentheses indicate the year when the movement was revived after being dormant or defunct after the initial establishment.

Africa

America

Asia

Australia / Oceania

Europe

Non-sovereign territories

Affiliated Boys' Brigade type movements

See also
 The Boys' Brigade Australia
 The Boys' Brigade Hong Kong
 The Boys' Brigade Malaysia
 The Boys' Brigade in Singapore
 The Boys' Brigade in the United Kingdom and Republic of Ireland
 The Girls' Brigade
 Frivilligt Drenge- og Pige-Forbund, Boys' Brigade partner organisation in Denmark
 Suomen Poikien ja Tyttöjen Keskus, Boys' Brigade partner organisation in Finland
 Church Lads' Brigade

References
 25.Mwisa- The Boys Brigade vesper . 25th Kitwe Company: History Into Print. 2016. p. 1. ISBN 9781858583334.

Sources

External links

  The Boys' Brigade in Australia
  The Boys' Brigade in Hong Kong
  The Boys' Brigade in Ireland
  The Boys' Brigade in Malaysia
  The Boys' Brigade in Malaysia - Official Webzine
  The Boys' Brigade in New Zealand
  The Boys' Brigade in Nigeria
  The Boys' Brigade in Singapore
  The Boys' Brigade in UK
  FDF; Boys' Brigade's partner organisation in Denmark, or Crossculture, FDF's international work
  PTK; Boys' Brigade's partner organisation in Finland
 Boys' and Girls' Brigade of the Fox Valley (USA)
 Boys' Brigade camp photographs c.1900
 London Stedfast Association for former Boys' Brigade members
 Behind Tourism International Project

 
Evangelical parachurch organizations
Christian youth organizations
Religious organizations established in 1883
Youth organisations based in the United Kingdom
1883 establishments in Scotland